Jan-Peter Nikiferow (born 8 November 1971) is a German gymnast. He competed at the 1996 Summer Olympics and the 2000 Summer Olympics.

References

External links
 

1971 births
Living people
German male artistic gymnasts
Olympic gymnasts of Germany
Gymnasts at the 1996 Summer Olympics
Gymnasts at the 2000 Summer Olympics
Sportspeople from Magdeburg
20th-century German people
21st-century German people